Phoberus rhyparoides is a beetle of the family Trogidae.

References

Phoberus
Beetles of Africa
Beetles described in 1872